Zachativka is a rural settlement in Volnovakha Raion, Donetsk Oblast (province) of eastern Ukraine. It is connected by road to the city of Mariupol on the coast in the south.

Villages in Volnovakha Raion